Medical Hall Historic District is a historic home and national historic district near Churchville, Harford County, Maryland, United States. The home was constructed of stuccoed stone between 1825 and 1840 and is five bays long, two bays wide, and two and a half stories high.  The façade features a centrally placed door with sidelights and a rectangular transom subdivided in a radiating pattern.  Also on the property is a stone springhouse which 20th century owners have converted into a pumphouse and a stone cottage believed to be a 19th-century tenant house.  The property is associated with John Archer (1741–1810), the first man to receive a degree in medicine in America. One of his sons was Congressman, judge of the circuit court, and Chief Justice of Maryland Stevenson Archer (1786–1848).

It was added to the National Register of Historic Places in 1973.

References

External links
, including undated photo, at Maryland Historical Trust
Boundary Map of the Medical Hall Historic District, Harford County, at Maryland Historical Trust

Houses in Harford County, Maryland
Houses on the National Register of Historic Places in Maryland
Historic districts in Harford County, Maryland
Historic American Buildings Survey in Maryland
Churchville, Maryland
Historic districts on the National Register of Historic Places in Maryland
National Register of Historic Places in Harford County, Maryland